The Austral 20 is a  long trailer sailer, designed and manufactured in Australia by Austral Yachts in Adelaide.

The boats feature roller reefing jibs and slab reefing mains as standard.

The Austral 20 is a roomy and easy to sail design, for which Austral Yachts won a design award in 1979. The hull is fibreglass construction with built in flotation. The hull contains  of lead moulded into the keel plus another  in the plate centreboard.

The cabin is spacious and provides sleeping accommodation for four people with provision for a portable toilet under the vee-berth.

References

Trailer sailers
Sailing in Australia